Guinan County is a county in the east of Qinghai Province, China. It is under the administration of Hainan Tibetan Autonomous Prefecture. The seat of Guinan County is in the Town of Mangqu.

Townships 
 Mangra

Climate

See also
 List of administrative divisions of Qinghai

References

County-level divisions of Qinghai
Hainan Tibetan Autonomous Prefecture